ADWAT is a French anti-tank blast mine used with the Matenin mine laying system. The mine has the same casing as the MI AC PR series of mines. The mine has a mechanical and electronic fuze. The mine incorporates a 30-minute arming delay, after which either the electronic or mechanical fuze can trigger the mine. The electronic fuze can be programmed using an external programmer with a three-pin connection to self-neutralize, self-destruct and act as an anti-handling device, with an active period of between one and 365 days.

The mine is reported to be resistant to blast and mine countermeasures.

Specifications
 Length: 282 mm
 Width: 188 mm
 Height: 104 mm
 Weight: 5.7 kg
 Explosive content: 3.9 kg of TNT

References
 Jane's Mines and Mine Clearance 2005-2006

Anti-tank mines
Land mines of France